The Red Wolf is a crime novel by Liza Marklund first published in 2003. It is a sequel to her novel The Bomber.

It was made into a movie in 2012.

Adaptations 

 The Red Wolf (2012), film directed by Agneta Fagerström-Olsson

External links 

2003 Swedish novels
Novels by Liza Marklund
Swedish crime novels
Sequel novels